Steven Anthony Tambellini (born May 14, 1958) is a Canadian former NHL player and former general manager for the Edmonton Oilers (July 2008 – April 2013). He is currently a scout for the Anaheim Ducks.

Playing career
Steve Tambellini played his junior hockey for the Lethbridge Broncos of the WHL from the 1975–76 season until the 1977–78 season, where he scored 155 goals and notched 181 assists in 193 games. He would earn the WCHL Rookie of the Year for his effort in the 1975–76 season.

In the 1978 NHL Entry Draft, Tambellini was chosen 15th overall by the New York Islanders. He would spend two years with New York, winning a Stanley Cup with them in the 1980 season. He was dealt at the trade deadline the next season along with Chico Resch to the Colorado Rockies in exchange for Mike McEwen. He stayed with Colorado for two seasons, including their first season as the New Jersey Devils as the franchise was relocated in 1982. While playing for the New Jersey Devils, Tambellini scored the new team's first ever hat trick on December 3, 1982 in a 5-4 victory over Hartford. After the 1982–83 season, Steve was traded to the Calgary Flames. He would remain there for two seasons before signing on as a free agent with the Vancouver Canucks, where he would round out his NHL career.

He would go on to play a minor amount of time in both the Swiss Hockey League and the Austrian Hockey League.

International Play
During his career, Steve Tambellini represented Canada on three separate occasions: In 1978 he played for Team Canada in the World Junior Hockey Championship, winning a bronze medal after scoring two goals and two assists. He played in the World Hockey Championship as well as the 1988 Winter Olympics in Calgary, Alberta, Canada, where he scored a goal and three assists.

After retirement
After his retirement from hockey, he was hired by the Canucks as the Director of Public and Media Relations and remained with the franchise until July 2008. In 1997, he would be promoted to Senior Vice-president of Hockey Operations. In 1998 his position would change again, this time to the Vice-president of Player Personnel. In this position he would oversee player development and professional player scouting, until eventually being named Assistant General Manager to Dave Nonis and to Mike Gillis after Nonis was fired by the Canucks on April 14, 2008.

In 2002, he was the Director of Player Personnel for the gold medal winning Canadian Olympic Men's Ice Hockey Team at the 2002 Winter Olympics. He would be rewarded again, being named the Director of Player Personnel for both the 2003 World Junior Ice Hockey Championships as well as the 2004 World Cup of Hockey.

In 2004, he was inducted into the British Columbia Hockey Hall of Fame.

On July 31, 2008 he was named General Manager of the Edmonton Oilers after the Oilers promoted Kevin Lowe to President of Hockey Operations.

On April 13, 2013 he was fired by the Edmonton Oilers, and was replaced by Craig MacTavish. The Anaheim Ducks hired Tambellini as a part-time scout on November 21, 2013.

Personal life
His father, Addie Tambellini, helped the Trail Smoke Eaters win the 1961 World Ice Hockey Championships, the last Canadian amateur team to do so. His oldest son, Jeff Tambellini, was drafted 27th overall by the Los Angeles Kings in the 2003 NHL Entry Draft. Jeff is now following in his grandfather’s foot steps becoming the Head Coach and General Manager of the Trail Smoke Eaters of the BCHL in 2018. His youngest son Adam Tambellini, was drafted by the New York Rangers 65th overall in the 2013 NHL Draft and currently plays for Rogle BK of the Swedish Hockey League.

Career statistics

Regular season and playoffs

International

References

External links

1958 births
Anaheim Ducks scouts
Calgary Flames players
Canadian ice hockey centres
Colorado Rockies (NHL) players
Edmonton Oilers executives
Ice hockey people from British Columbia
Ice hockey players at the 1988 Winter Olympics
Lethbridge Broncos players
Living people
National Hockey League first-round draft picks
New Jersey Devils players
New York Islanders draft picks
New York Islanders players
Olympic ice hockey players of Canada
Sportspeople from Trail, British Columbia
Stanley Cup champions
Vancouver Canucks executives
Vancouver Canucks players
Vancouver Canucks scouts